New Swannington is an area between the Leicestershire, England, villages of Whitwick and Swannington, comprising just a handful of buildings and houses which straddle the stretch of Church Lane which runs from Swannington to the point where it is intersected by Thornborough Road and Brooks Lane at Whitwick.

Buildings of note are an off-licence, the New Swannington Primary School and a Wesleyan Reform Church built in 1906. The church contains a tablet, dedicated to the memory of a workman who fell from the roof and died during its construction. The New Swannington fellowship is believed to have been formed as a break-away congregation from the Wesleyan Reform Church in Whitwick, which still stands (now used for industrial purposes, currently occupied by 'Gracedieu Windows') on North Street, Whitwick, a short distance from The Dumps cross-roads, to the rear of the former Stinson's Butchers Shop.

External links
 - New Swannington Primary School Website

Hamlets in Leicestershire
North West Leicestershire District